Yenice is a village in the Kâhta District, Adıyaman Province, Turkey. The village is populated by Kurds of the Canbegan tribe and had a population of 62 in 2021.

References 

Villages in Kâhta District
Kurdish settlements in Adıyaman Province